Vila Velha (Portuguese for "Old Village") is a coastal city in Espírito Santo, Brazil. It lies across from Vitória, the state capital. Its population was 501,325 (2020) and its area is 210.23 km².

Geography

Vila Velha forms part of the Greater Vitória metropolitan area. To the north is Vitória, to the west Cariacica and Viana, to the south Guarapari, and to the east the Atlantic Ocean.
The Deputy Darcy Castelo de Mendonça Bridge, known as Third Bridge (Portuguese: Terceira Ponte), is the second tallest bridge in Brazil, connecting and reducing the distance between the cities of Vila Velha and Vitória.

The Jacarenema Ecological Reserve, a  conservation area established in 1997, lies along the coast to the south of the main city and contains the mangrove estuary of the Jucu River.

Economy

Notable corporations in Vila Velha include Garoto, one of Brazil's largest chocolate manufacturers.

Vila Velha has been through several years of intense real estate development and several luxury buildings are now a common sight in all of its main beaches. Some critics argue that this practice can be considered excess urbanization of a previously low-profile area, despite the economic benefits.

History
Vila Velha is the oldest township in Espírito Santo. (The nickname "Green Shins" given to people from Vila Velha originated from the green algae that stuck to the legs of sailors returning from shore to Coutinho's ship.) He was forced to return to Portugal around 1550 in order to recruit new colonists, as there were not enough to sustain the colony. Upon his return, however, he discovered that there had been violent disputes between the colonists, slaves, and Indians, which had forced most inhabitants to flee to the island of Vitória. In response, Coutinho relocated the capital to Vitória. Afterward, Vila Velha remained a quiet town until quite recently; the 1828 census, for example, showed only 1,250 people in the town. Today, however, Vila Velha is the biggest city in the entire state of Espírito Santo and has approximately 500,000 inhabitants.

References

External links
 History of Vila Velha (in Portuguese)
 History of Ponta da Fruta Vila Velha (in Portuguese)

 
Populated places established in 1535
1535 establishments in Brazil
Populated coastal places in Espírito Santo
Municipalities in Espírito Santo